Luccas Paraizo Feitosa (born 5 July 2002), known as Luccas Paraizo or just Paraizo, is a Brazilian footballer who plays as a forward for Portuguesa.

Club career

Noroeste
Born in São Paulo, Paraizo moved to Americana when his mother emigrated to Germany. He began his career with Noroeste in 2018, and was also approved on a trial at SV Sandhausen in the following year, when visiting his mother; the move, however, did not came true.

After progressing through the youth setup, Paraizo signed his first professional contract with Noroeste on 21 January 2021, and made his senior debut on 7 March of that year, coming on as a second-half substitute in a 2–1 Campeonato Paulista Série A3 away win over Bandeirante.

Paraizo scored his first senior goal on 12 October 2021, netting the winner in a 1–0 home success over Rio Claro, for the year's Copa Paulista. In November, he was loaned to the under-20 side of Matonense for the 2022 Copa São Paulo de Futebol Júnior.

Portuguesa
In April 2022, Paraizo joined Portuguesa, being initially assigned to the under-20s. He renewed his contract with the club until November 2024 on 23 June, and made his debut for the club on 3 July, in a 1–0 Copa Paulista home loss against Água Santa.

Paraizo finished the 2022  as the top scorer with 22 goals in 25 matches, and was definitely promoted to the main squad for the 2023 campaign. He scored his first goal for Lusa on 21 January of that year, netting his side's second in a 3–0 home win over Red Bull Bragantino.

Career statistics

Honours

Individual
 top scorer: 2022

References

2002 births
Living people
Footballers from São Paulo
Brazilian footballers
Association football forwards
Esporte Clube Noroeste players
Associação Portuguesa de Desportos players